Events in the year 2013 in Belarus.

Incumbents 

 President: Alexander Lukashenko
 Prime Minister: Mikhail Myasnikovich

Events

Deaths 

 5 December – Iryna Charnushenka-Stasiuk, Olympic long jumper (b. 1979).

See also 

 List of years in Belarus
 2013 in Belarus

References

External links 

 

 
Years of the 21st century in Belarus
2010s in Belarus
Belarus
Belarus